John Boswell Whitehead (August 18, 1872 in Norfolk, Virginia – November 16, 1954 in Baltimore, Maryland) was an American electrical engineer and a professor at Johns Hopkins University as well as the dean of the School of Engineering. Whitehead was president of the American Institute of Electrical Engineers from 1933 to 1934. In 1941, Whitehead received the IEEE Edison Medal for "contributions to the field of electrical engineering, his pioneering and development in the field of dielectric research, and his achievements in the advancement of engineering education".

References

External links
 Biography

IEEE Edison Medal recipients
1872 births
1954 deaths
Fellows of the American Physical Society